Poux is a French surname. Notable people with the surname include:

 Gilles Poux (born 1957), French politician
 Jean-Baptiste Poux (born 1979), French rugby union footballer
 Paul Poux (born 1984), French cyclist

See also
 Pou

French-language surnames